André Roothman, also known as Andre Roddtman, is a South African actor and teacher. In a career spanning more than four decades, Roothman had made several notable roles in theatre, cinema and television. He is best known for the roles in the films; Consequence, Charlie Jade, Cape Town as well as Arende franchise and soap operas 7de Laan and Arendsvlei.

Personal life
Roothman was born in Cape Town, South Africa. In 1978, he graduated from the University of Stellenbosch with a BA degree.

On 10 December 2011, Andre along with his friend Uys Winterbagh, 34, from Oranjezicht, departed from the De Hoop Nature Reserve and were headed towards Cape Infanta by a double sea kayak. However their craft capsized in the big sea conditions and they were unable to get back into it. On the next day, NSRI Agulhas and NSRI Witsand volunteer duty crews with the Overberg Fire and Rescue helicopter, a Squirrel B2 rescued them.

Career
After graduation, he worked as a teacher at Cloetesville Secondary School in Cape Town. Then he joined the Cape Performing Arts Council (CAPAB) in 1983 as a performing artist. Meanwhile, he joined theatre productions for Ben Dehaeck and the Little Libertas Theater. At this time in 1970s, he joined with the community-based satirical theater called The Breughel Theater. In 1983, as a professional actor he performed in the stage plays such as; Provost in Measure for Measure, and Maynardville (1987). In 1995, he won the Vita Award for his role in Reza de Wet's stage play Drif and later had Fleur du Cap nominations as Best Supporting Actor in two productions of Drif, one for CAPAB in 1994 and the other for Dubbelpunt Produksies in 2015.

In 1978, he entered cinema, but not as an actor, where he was the clapper loader of the technical crew for the film Die Spaanse Vlieg. Then in 1986, he appeared in the direct-to-video film Heroes with an uncredited role. In the same year, he made the television debut with the serial Ou Grote and played the supportive role "Charlie Steyn". In the next year, he made his first film role of "Head Regulator" in the 1978 film Survivor.

In 1992, he joined with the Arende television franchise serial and played the role "P.J. Buys" in both part II (Arende II: MoordenaarsKaroo in 1992) and part III (Arende III: Dorsland in 1993). After the huge success of the serial, it was later made into a film in 1994 with the same title Arende where Roothman reprised his role. In 1998, he appeared in the SABC2 Afrikaans television serial Voete van Goud. In 2000s, he performed in the stage plays such as; Die Goue Seun (KKNK 2002), My Zinc Bed (2005), Mooi Maria (2011), Moeder Moed en Haar Kinders (Aardklop and KKNK 2014 and 2015), and Die Nag van Legio at Innibos in 2017. In 2002, he acted in the American comedy film Home Alone 4: Taking Back the House.

Filmography

References

External links
 IMDb

Living people
South African male film actors
Year of birth missing (living people)